The Morane-Saulnier AF, also known as the Morane-Saulnier Type AF and the MoS 28 was a French First World War single-seat biplane fighter prototype from 1917.

Development
Although the fuselage was similar to that of the contemporary Morane-Saulnier Type AI parasol monoplane and preceding Morane-Saulnier AC shoulder wing monoplane, this aircraft was designed as a biplane. It was Morane-Saulnier's first single-seat fighter biplane as the company normally specialized in monoplanes.
The AF was first flown on 23 June 1917 and tested by the Aviation Militaire in late 1917 however it was passed over for production in favour of the SPAD XIII, Morane-Saulnier Type AI and Nieuport 28. In November 1917 a floatplane version of the AF was flight tested with a single central pontoon-like float, but was not adopted.

Variants
 Morane-Saulnier AC - shoulder wing fighter
 Morane-Saulnier AI - parasol wing fighter
 Morane-Saulnier AF - biplane fighter
 Morane-Saulnier AFH - floatplane version of biplane fighter

Specifications (AF)

Notes

Bibliography

Further reading

1910s French fighter aircraft
AF
Rotary-engined aircraft
Aircraft first flown in 1917